Mekanix is a six issue comic book limited series published in 2002-2003 by Marvel Comics, written by Chris Claremont, pencilled by Juan Bobillo and inked by Marcelo Sosa.

Plot

Once the youngest member of the X-Men, Kitty Pryde has made the decision to leave her former super hero life. She enrolls in The University of Chicago and tries to lead a normal life. Unfortunately, the same bigotry and hatred against mutants continues to haunt her, threatening new and old friends alike. The anti-mutant group Purity sabotages an experiment Kitty was participating in, causing her and two other mutants, Xuân Cao Mạnh (Karma) and a Genoshan exchange student Shola Inkosi, to reveal their mutant powers to save their fellow students.

They are investigated by the FBI under the suspicion of terrorism and generally harassed by the mutant-hating population. The student Alice Tremaine, the mastermind behind Purity, even goes as far as trying to get them banned from campus. While the student council meeting ensues, they are attacked by a group of rogue Sentinels. They give it their all and successfully defeat them.

References
Marvel.com

Marvel Comics limited series
2002 comics debuts